Conus africanus, common name the African cone, is a species of predatory sea snail, a marine gastropod mollusk in the family Conidae, the cone snails, cone shells or cones.

Like all species within the genus Conus, these snails are predatory and venomous. They are capable of "stinging" humans, therefore live ones should be handled carefully or not at all.

This species has been recently declared "least concern" in 2012, after it had been declared "vulnerable" on the IUCN Red List in 1996.

Description
The size of the shell varies between 13 mm and  30 mm.

Distribution 
This marine species is endemic to Angola and West Africa.

References 

 Kiener L.C. 1844-1850. Spécies général et iconographie des coquilles vivantes. Vol. 2. Famille des Enroulées. Genre Cone (Conus, Lam.), pp. 1-379, pl. 1-111 [pp. 1-48 (1846); 49-160 (1847); 161-192 (1848); 193-240 (1849); 241-[379](assumed to be 1850); plates 4,6 (1844); 2-3, 5, 7-32, 34-36, 38, 40-50 (1845); 33, 37, 39, 51-52, 54-56, 57-68, 74-77 (1846); 1, 69-73, 78-103 (1847); 104-106 (1848); 107 (1849); 108-111 (1850)]. Paris, Rousseau & J.B. Baillière
 Filmer R.M. (2001). A Catalogue of Nomenclature and Taxonomy in the Living Conidae 1758 - 1998. Backhuys Publishers, Leiden. 388pp
 Tucker J.K. (2009). Recent cone species database. September 4, 2009 Edition
 Puillandre N., Duda T.F., Meyer C., Olivera B.M. & Bouchet P. (2015). One, four or 100 genera? A new classification of the cone snails. Journal of Molluscan Studies. 81: 1-23

External links
 
 Cone Shells - Knights of the Sea
 

africanus
Gastropods described in 1845
Invertebrates of Angola
Endemic fauna of Angola
Gastropods of Africa
Taxonomy articles created by Polbot